is the 3rd single by Japanese girl group SKE48. It reached the 3rd place on the weekly Oricon Singles Chart and, as of February 20, 2012 (issue date), has sold 96,049 copies.

References

2010 singles
Japanese-language songs
Songs with lyrics by Yasushi Akimoto
SKE48 songs
2010 songs